Jean Berko Gleason (born 1931) is an American psycholinguist and professor emerita in the Department of Psychological and Brain Sciences at Boston University who has made fundamental contributions to the understanding of language acquisition in children, aphasia, gender differences in language development, and parent–child interactions.

Gleason created the Wug Test, in which a child is shown pictures with nonsense names and then prompted to complete statements about them, and used it to demonstrate that even young children possess implicit knowledge of linguistic morphology. Menn and Ratner have written that "Perhaps no innovation other than the invention of the tape recorder has had such an indelible effect on the field of child language research", the "wug" (one of the imaginary creatures Gleason drew in creating the Wug Test) being "so basic to what [psycholinguists] know and do that increasingly it appears in the popular literature without attribution to its origins."

Biography

Jean Berko was born to Hungarian immigrant parents in Cleveland, Ohio. As a child, she has said, "I was under the impression that whatever you said meant something in some language."  Her older brother's cerebral palsy made it difficult for most people to understand his speech, but

After graduating from Cleveland Heights High School in 1949, Berko Gleason (then yet Berko) earned a B.A. in history and literature from Radcliffe College, then an M.A. in linguistics, and a combined Ph.D. in linguistics and psychology, at Harvard; from 1958 to 1959 she was a postdoctoral fellow at MIT. In graduate school she was advised by Roger Brown, a founder in the field of child language acquisition. In January 1959 she married Harvard mathematician Andrew Gleason; they had three daughters.

Most of Berko Gleason's professional career has been at Boston University, where she served as Psychology Department chair and director of the Graduate Program in Applied Linguistics; Lise Menn and Harold Goodglass were among her collaborators there.

She has been a visiting scholar at Harvard University, Stanford University, and at the Linguistics Institute of the Hungarian Academy of Sciences.  Although officially retired and no longer teaching, she  to be involved in research.

Gleason is the author or co-author of some 125 papers on language development in children, language attrition, aphasia, and gender and cultural aspects of language acquisition and use; and is editor/coeditor of two widely used textbooks, The Development of Language (first edition 1985, ninth edition 2016) and Psycholinguistics (1993). She is a Fellow of the American Association for the Advancement of Science and of the American Psychological Association, and was president of the International Association for the Study of Child Language from 1990 to 1993, and of the Gypsy Lore Society 1996 to 1999.
She has also served on the editorial boards of numerous academic and professional journals and was associate editor of Language from 1997 to 1999.

Gleason was profiled in Beyond the Glass Ceiling: Forty Women Whose Ideas Shape the Modern World (1996).
A festschrift in her honor, Methods for Studying Language Production, was published in 2000.
In 2016 she received an honorary Doctor of Science degree from Washington & Jefferson College for her work as "a pioneer in the field of psycholinguistics",
and in 2017 the Roger Brown Award (recognizing "outstanding contribution to the international child language community") from the International Association for the Study of Child Language.

Since 2007 she has delivered the "Welcome, welcome" and "Goodbye, goodbye" speeches at the annual Ig Nobel Awards ceremonies.

Selected research

Children's learning of English morphologythe Wug Test

A child is shown simple pictures of a fanciful creature or activity,
with a nonsense name, and prompted to complete a statement about it:
This is a WUG. Now there is another one. There are two of them. There are two .
Each "target" word was a made-up (but plausible-sounding) pseudoword, so that the child cannot have heard it before.
A child who knows that the plural of witch is witches may have heard and memorized that pair, but a child responding that the plural of wug (which the child presumably has never heard) is wugs (/wʌgz/, using the /z/ allomorph since "wug" ends in a voiced consonant) has apparently inferred (perhaps unconsciously) the basic rule for forming plurals.

The Wug Test also includes questions involving verb conjugations, possessives, and other common derivational morphemes such as the agentive -er (e.g. "A man who 'zibs' is a ?"),
and requested explanations of common compound words e.g. "Why is a birthday called a birthday?"
Other items included:
This is a dog with QUIRKS on him. He is all covered in QUIRKS. What kind of a dog is he? He is a  dog.
This is a man who knows how to SPOW. He is SPOWING. He did the same thing yesterday. What did he do yesterday? Yesterday he .
(The expected answers were QUIRKY and SPOWED.)

Gleason's major finding was that even very young children are able to connect suitable endingsto produce plurals, past tenses, possessives, and other formsto nonsense words they have never heard before, implying that they have internalized systematic aspects of the linguistic system which no one has necessarily tried to teach them.
However, she also identified an earlier stage at which children can produce such forms for real words, but not yet for nonsense wordsimplying that children start by memorizing singularplural pairs they hear spoken by others, then eventually extract rules and patterns from these examples which they apply to novel words.

The Wug Test was the first experimental proof that young children have extracted generalizable rules from the language around them, rather than simply memorizing words that they have heard, and it was almost immediately adapted for children speaking languages other than English, to bilingual children, and to children (and adults) with various impairments or from a variety of cultural backgrounds. Its conclusions are viewed as essential to the understanding of when and how children reach major language milestones, and its variations and progeny remain in use worldwide for studies on language acquisition. It is "almost universal" for textbooks in psycholinguistics and language acquisition to include assignments calling for the student to carry out a practical variation of the Wug Test paradigm. The ubiquity of discussion of the wug test has led to the wug being used as a mascot of sorts for linguists and linguistics students.

The Wug Test's fundamental role in the development of psycholinguistics as a discipline has been mapped by studying references to Gleason's work in "seminal journals" in the field, many of which carried articles referencing it in their founding issues:

According to Ratner and Menn, "As an enduring concept in psycholinguistic research, the wug has become generic, like [kleenex] or [xerox], a concept so basic to what we know and do that increasingly it appears in the popular literature without attribution to its origins... Perhaps no innovation other than the invention of the tape recorder has had such an indelible effect on the field of child language research."

It has been proposed that Wug Testlike instruments be used in the diagnosis of learning disabilities, but in practice success in this direction has been limited.

Parent–child interactions

Another of Gleason's early papers "Fathers and Other Strangers: Men's Speech to Young Children" (1975) explored differences between mothers' and fathers' spoken interaction with their children, primarily using data produced by two female and two male daycare teachers at a large university, and by three mothers and three fathers, mostly during family dinners.
Among other conclusions, this study found that:
mothers used less complex constructions in speaking to their children than did fathers;
mothers generated lengthier and more complex constructions in speaking to their eldest child than to their younger children;
fathers issued significantly more commands than did mothers, along with more threats and more teasing in the way of namecalling; and
the fathers' language also reflected traditional gender roles in the families (such as in an example in which a father, playing a game with his son, directs the son to the mother when the need for a diaper change arises).

In contrast, both male and female daycare teachers used language that was similar both quantitatively and qualitatively, with both focusing on a dialogue based in the present and on the immediate needs of the children.
Differences included that the male teachers tended to address the children by name more often than did the female teachers and that the male teachers issued more imperatives than did the female teachers.

Acquisition of routines in children

Gleason's research eventually extended into the study of children's acquisition of routinesthat is, standardized chunks of language (or language-plus-gesture) that the culture expects of everyone, such as greetings, farewells, and expressions of thanks.  Gleason was one of the first to study the acquisition of politeness, examining English-speaking children's use of routines such as thank you, please, and I'm sorry. Researchers in this area have since studied both verbal and non-verbal routinization, and the development of politeness routines in a variety of cultures and languages.

The Halloween routine

Gleason's 1976 paper with Weintraub, "The Acquisition of Routines in Child Language",
analyzed performance on the culturally standardized Halloween trick-or-treat routine in 115 children aged two to sixteen years.
Alterations in ability and the function of parental contribution were analyzed concerning cognitive and social components.
They discovered that in the acquisition of routines
(in contrast to the acquisition of much of the rest of language) parents' major interest is for their children to achieve accurate performance, with little stress on children's understanding of what they are expected to say.
Gleason and Weintraub found that the parents rarely if ever explain to children the meaning of such routines as Bye-bye or Trick or treatthere was no concern with the child's thoughts or intentions as long as the routine was performed as expected at the appropriate times.
Thus, parents' role in the acquisition of routines is very different from their role in most of the rest of language development.

"Hi, Thanks, and Goodbye"

Gleason and Greif analyzed children's acquisition of three ubiquitous routines in "Hi, Thanks, and Goodbye: More Routine Information" (1980).
The subjects were eleven boys and eleven girls and their parents.
At the conclusion of a parent-child play period, an assistant entered the playroom bearing a present, in order to evoke routines from the children.
The study's purpose was to analyze how parents communicate these routines to their children; major questions proposed included whether or not some routines were more obligatory than others, and whether mothers and fathers provide different models of politeness behavior for their children. The results suggest that children's spontaneous construction of the three routines was low, with Thank you the rarest.
However, parents strongly encouraged their children to generate routines and, typically, the children complied.
In addition, parents were more likely to prompt the Thank you routine than the Hi and Goodbye routines.
Parents practiced the routines themselves, though mothers were more likely than fathers to speak Thank you and Goodbye to the assistant.

Apologies

Gleason and Ely made an in-depth study of apologies in children's dialogue in their paper, "I'm sorry I said that: apologies in young children's discourse" (2006),
which analyzed apology term usage (in parent–child dialogue) of five boys and four girls, aged one to six years.
Their research suggested that apologies appear later in children than do other politeness routines, and that as the children grew older they developed a progressively refined expertise with this routine, gradually requiring fewer direct prompts and producing more elaborate apologies instead of just saying "I'm sorry".
They also found that parents and other adults play an important role in fostering growth of apologetic abilities through the setting of examples, by encouraging the children to apologize, and by speaking specifically and purposefully to them about apologies.

Attention to language in family discourse

With Ely, MacGibbon, and Zaretsky, Gleason also explored the discourse of middle-class parents and their children at the dinner table in, "Attention to Language: Lessons Learned at the Dinner Table" (2001),
finding that the everyday language of these parents involves a remarkable portion of attention to language.
The dinner-table conversation of twentytwo middle-class families, each with a child between two years and five and onehalf years old, were recorded,
then analyzed for the existence and activity of languagecentered terms, including words like ask, tell, say, and speak.
Mothers spoke more about language than did fathers, and fathers spoke more about it than did children:
roughly eleven percent of mothers' sentences contained one or more languagecentered terms, and the corresponding proportions for fathers and children were seven percent and four percent.
Uses that were metalinguistic (for example, accounting for and remarking on speech) exceeded uses that were pragmatic (for example, managing how and when speech appears).

The more that mothers used language-centered terms, the more the children did as wellbut this was not true for fathers.
The results imply that in routine family conversations, parents supply children with considerable information on the way language is used to communicate information.

Foreign-language studies

Gleason has carried out significant research involving the learning and maintenance of second languages by sequential bilinguals. She has studied the acquisition of a second language while retaining the first (additive bilingualism),
examining discourse behaviors of parents who follow the one person-one language principle by using different languages with their child
She has also studied language attrition, the loss of a known language through lack of use,
and suggests that the order in which a language is learned is less important in predicting its retention than the thoroughness with which it is learned.

Psychophysiological responses to taboo words

An unusual study carried out with Harris and Aycicegi, "Taboo words and reprimands elicit greater autonomic reactivity in a first language than in a second language" (2003), investigated the involuntary psychophysiological reactions of bilingual speakers to taboo words.
Thirtytwo TurkishEnglish bilinguals judged the pleasantness of an array of words and phrases in Turkish (their first language), and in English (their second), while their skin conductance was monitored via fingertip electrodes.
Participants manifested greater autonomic arousal in response to taboo words and childhood reprimands in their first language than to those in their second language, confirming the commonplace claim that speakers of two languages are less uncomfortable speaking taboo words and phrases in their second language than in their native language.

Maintenance of first and second languages

In "Maintaining Foreign Language Skills", which discusses "the personal, cultural, and instructional factors involved with keeping up foreign language skills" (1988), Gleason and Pan consider both humans' remarkable capacity for language acquisition and their ability to lose it.
In addition to brain damage, strokes, trauma and other physical causes of language loss, individuals may lose language skills due to the absence of a linguistically supportive social environment in which to maintain such skills, such as when a speaker of a given language relocates to a place where that language is not spoken. Culture also factors in. More often than not, individuals speaking two or more languages come into contact with one another, for reasons ranging from emigration and interrelationships to alterations in political borders. The result of such contact is typically that the community of speakers undergoes a progressive shift in usage from one language to the other.

Aphasia

Gleason has also done significant research on aphasia,
a condition (usually due to brain injury) in which a person's ability to understand and/or to produce language, including their ability to find the words they need and their use of basic morphology and syntax, is impaired in a variety of ways.

In "Some Linguistic Structures in the Speech of a Broca's Aphasic" (1972) Gleason, Goodglass, Bernholtz, and Hyde discuss an experiment carried out with a man who, after a stroke, had been left with Broca's aphasia/agrammatism,
a specific form of aphasia typically impairing the production of morphology and syntax more than it impairs comprehension.
This experiment employed the Story Completion Test (often used to probe a subject's capacity for producing various common grammatical forms)
as well as free conversation and repetition to elicit speech from the subject;
this speech was then analyzed to evaluate how well he used inflectional morphology
(e.g. plural and past tense word endings) and basic syntax (the formation of, for example, simple declarative, imperative, and interrogative sentences).

To do this the investigator, in a few sentences, began a simple story about a pictured situation, then asked the subject to conclude the narrative.
The stories were so designed that a nonlanguageimpaired person's response would typically employ particular structures, for example, the plural of a noun, the past tense of a verb, or a simple but complete yesno question (e.g. "Did you take my shoes?").

Gleason, Goodglass, Bernholtz, and Hyde concluded that the transition from verb to object was easier for this subject than was the transition from subject to verb and that auxiliary verbs and verb inflections were the parts of speech most likely to be omitted by the subject. There was considerable variation among consecutive repeat trials of the same test item, although responses on successive attempts usually came closer to those a normal speaker would have produced.  The study concluded that the subject's speech was not the product of a stable abnormal grammar, and could not be accounted for by assuming that he was simply omitting words to minimize his effort in producing themquestions
of significant theoretical controversy at the time.

Selected publications

Papers
 
 
 
  JSLHR Editor's Award

Book chapters 
 
  Reprinted as

Textbooks
  Latest edition: 
 Latest edition:

Notes

References

External links
 Curriculum vitae 

Departmental page
Nova/PBS: The Secret Life of Scientists and EngineersJean Berko GleasonPsycholinguist/Speed Demon
World Science FestivalSpotlight: The Dao of Zib Gleason discusses her education, career, and the Wug Test
On BeingJean Berko GleasonUnfolding Language, Unfolding Life
Brief video of Gleason administering a Wug test. With Stephen Fry.

Linguists from the United States
Women linguists
American women psychologists
American developmental psychologists
Developmental psycholinguists
Phonologists
Boston University faculty
Fellows of the American Association for the Advancement of Science
Radcliffe College alumni
1931 births
Living people
Cleveland Heights High School alumni
American women academics
21st-century American women